In enzymology, a cysteine synthase is an enzyme that catalyzes the chemical reaction

O3-acetyl-L-serine + hydrogen sulfide  L-cysteine + acetate

Thus, the two substrates of this enzyme are O3-acetyl-L-serine and hydrogen sulfide, whereas its two products are L-cysteine and acetate.

This enzyme belongs to the family of transferases, specifically those transferring aryl or alkyl groups other than methyl groups.  The systematic name of this enzyme class is O3-acetyl-L-serine:hydrogen-sulfide 2-amino-2-carboxyethyltransferase. Other names in common use include O-acetyl-L-serine sulfhydrylase, O-acetyl-L-serine sulfohydrolase, O-acetylserine (thiol)-lyase, O-acetylserine (thiol)-lyase A, O-acetylserine sulfhydrylase, O3-acetyl-L-serine acetate-lyase (adding hydrogen-sulfide), acetylserine sulfhydrylase, cysteine synthetase, S-sulfocysteine synthase, 3-O-acetyl-L-serine:hydrogen-sulfide, and 2-amino-2-carboxyethyltransferase.  This enzyme participates in 3 metabolic pathways: cysteine metabolism, selenoamino acid metabolism, and sulfur metabolism.  It employs one cofactor, pyridoxal phosphate.

Structural studies

References

 
 
 
 
 
 

EC 2.5.1
Pyridoxal phosphate enzymes
Enzymes of known structure